Matthew Dylan Lieberman is a Professor and Social Cognitive Neuroscience Lab Director at UCLA Department of Psychology, Psychiatry and Biobehavioral Sciences.

Personal life and education
Lieberman was born on May 5, 1970 in Atlantic City, New Jersey. His father was a lawyer and his mother an art teacher. His wife, Naomi Eisenberger, is a full professor on the UCLA Psychology Department faculty. Lieberman is a graduate of Harvard University, where he later taught several classes. Naomi Eisenberger and Matthew Lieberman have a son.

Research and Career
Lieberman's work has been funded by the National Institute of Mental Health, National Science Foundation, Guggenheim Foundation, DARPA, and the Office of Naval Research.

Lieberman conducts research into the neural bases of social cognition and social experience, with particular emphasis on the neural bases of emotion regulation, persuasion, social rejection, self-knowledge, theory of mind, and fairness. Lieberman coined the term social cognitive neuroscience. His research interests also include Neural Bases of Automatic and Controlled Social Cognition & Affect and Neural Bases of Personality.Social cognitive neuroscience focuses on how the human brain carries out social information processing. Lieberman uses functional neuroimaging  (fMRI) and neuropsychology to test new hypotheses regarding social cognition.

Lieberman is the founding editor of the journal, Social Cognitive and Affective Neuroscience.

In 2007, he won the APA Distinguished Scientific Award for an Early Career Contribution to Psychology.

In 2011, he was the recipient of UCLA Gold Shield Faculty Prize.

Selected publications
 Lieberman, M. D. (2013). Social: Why our brains are wired to connect. New York, NY: Crown
 Lieberman, M. D. (2010). Social cognitive neuroscience. In S. T. Fiske, D. T. Gilbert, & G. Lindzey (Eds). Handbook of Social Psychology (5th ed.) (pp. 143–193). New York, NY: McGraw-Hill. 
 Falk, E. B., Berkman, E. T., Mann, T., Harrison, B, & Lieberman, M. D. (2010). Predicting persuasion-induced behavior change from the brain. Journal of Neuroscience, 30, 8421-8424. 
 Lieberman, M. D., Eisenberger, N. I., Crockett, M. J., Tom, S., Pfeifer, J. H., Way, B. M. (2007). Putting feelings into words: Affect labeling disrupts amygdala activity to affective stimuli. Psychological Science, 18, 421-428. 
 Eisenberger, N. I., Lieberman, M. D., & Williams, K. D. (2003). Does rejection hurt? An fMRI study of social exclusion. Science, 302, 290-292.

References

External links
 Putting Feelings Into Words 
 Brain Scans Reveal Why Meditation Works
Which ads are winners? Your brain knows

University of California, Los Angeles faculty
Living people
Harvard University alumni
1970 births
American neuroscientists